Sidetrack may refer to:

 Sidetrack (rail transport), a railroad track auxiliary to the main track
 Sidetrack (G.I. Joe), a fictional character in the G.I. Joe universe
 Sidetrack (Transformers), a fictional character in the Transformers universe
 Sidetrack Bar & Grill, a bar & restaurant in Ypsilanti, Michigan
 Sidetrack Films, a film production company based out of Brooklyn, New York
 Sidetracks: Explorations of a Romantic Biographer, a 2000 autobiography by British biographer Richard Holmes

See also
 Sidetracked (disambiguation)